Odutola is a surname. Notable people with the surname include:

Adeola Odutola (1902–1995), Nigerian businessman
Solomon Odunaiya Odutola ( 1897–?), Nigerian Anglican clergyman
Toyin Ojih Odutola (born 1985), Nigerian visual artist 

Surnames of Nigerian origin